Maciej Pałaszewski (born 7 April 1998) is a Polish professional footballer who plays as a midfielder for Polish III liga side Wieczysta Kraków. He has also represented Poland at youth international level.

Club career

Pałaszewski started his career with Śląsk Wrocław.

On 9 August 2016, Pałaszewski made his senior debut whilst on loan at Raków Częstochowa, playing the first half in a 3–2 loss to KSZO Ostrowiec in the Polish Cup.
The following season, on 23 October 2017, he made his league debut for Śląsk Wrocław as a 77th minute substitute in a 4–1 loss to Wisła Płock.

International career
Pałaszewski has represented Poland at under-18, under-19 and under-20 level.

References

External links

Living people
1998 births
Śląsk Wrocław players
Raków Częstochowa players
OKS Stomil Olsztyn players
Górnik Polkowice players
A.E. Kifisia F.C. players
Wieczysta Kraków players
Poland youth international footballers
Association football midfielders
Ekstraklasa players
I liga players
II liga players
III liga players
Super League Greece 2 players
Polish footballers
Polish expatriate footballers
Polish expatriate sportspeople in Greece
Expatriate footballers in Greece
Sportspeople from Wrocław